Spotlight Scandals or Spotlight Revue is a 1943 American musical comedy film directed by William Beaudine.

It was the first of a four-picture contract comic actor Billy Gilbert signed with Monogram Pictures. Butch and Buddy, the team who appeared with Gilbert at Universal, travelled with them. The film was originally called 24 Hours Leave.

Cast
Billy Gilbert as Billy
Frank Fay as Frank
Bonnie Baker as Singer Bonnie Baker
Billy Lenhart as Butch
Charles D. Brown as Buddy
Harry Langdon as Oscar
Iris Adrian as Bernice
Jimmy Hollywood as Radio Rogues Member 
Eddie Bartell as Radio Rogues Member 
Sydney Chatton as Radio Rogues Member 
James Bush as Jerry
Claudia Dell as Betty
Eddie Parks as Eddie
Betty Blythe as Mrs. Baker
Herb Miller as Herb Miller, Orchestra Leader

References

External links
 

1943 films
1943 musical comedy films
1940s crime comedy films
American prison comedy films
American black-and-white films
Films directed by William Beaudine
Monogram Pictures films
American musical comedy films
American crime comedy films
1940s English-language films
1940s American films